Vék may refer to:
Dolný Vék, Slovakia
Horný Vék, Slovakia